Barbatia tenera, or Doc Bales' ark clam, is a clam in the family Arcidae. It can be found along the Atlantic coast of North America, ranging from southern Florida to the West Indies.

References

tenera
Bivalves described in 1845